This is a list of members of the ninth parliament of the South Australian House of Assembly, which sat from 1878 until April 1881. The members were elected at the 1878 election in May 1878.

 Light MHA Frank Skeffington Carroll resigned on 31 May 1878. David Moody won the resulting by-election on 12 June.
 Noarlunga MHA John Colton resigned on 29 August 1878. Thomas Atkinson won the resulting by-election on 14 September.
 Encounter Bay MHA James Boucaut resigned on 25 September 1878. William West-Erskine won the resulting by-election on 10 October.
 North Adelaide MHA Neville Blyth resigned on 2 December 1878. Caleb Peacock won the resulting by-election on 16 December.
 Noarlunga MHA John Carr resigned on 16 December 1879. John Colton won the resulting by-election on 6 January 1880.
 Gumeracha MHA Ebenezer Ward resigned on 5 April 1880. John Rounsevell won the resulting by-election on 24 April.
 Port Adelaide MHA William Quin resigned on 17 July 1880. John Hart, junior won the resulting by-election on 27 July.
 Stanley MHA George Strickland Kingston died on 26 November 1880. No by-election was held due to the proximity of the 1881 general election.

References

Members of South Australian parliaments by term
19th-century Australian politicians